Rampant is the fifth studio album by the Scottish hard rock band Nazareth, released in 1974. It was the third of their LP albums to be produced by Roger Glover, and proved to be the last time they would work with him.

The track "Loved and Lost" was sampled by DJ Shadow on "Enemy Lines" from his 2011 album The Less You Know, The Better.

Track listing

30th Anniversary Bonus Tracks

Salvo Records Remaster Bonus Tracks

Salvo Records released a version in 2010 with the following bonus tracks:

Personnel

Band members
Dan McCafferty - vocals, photography
Pete Agnew - bass guitar, guitar, background vocals, liner notes
Manny Charlton - guitars, producer, photography
Darrell Sweet - drums, background vocals, liner notes, photography

Additional musicians
Vicki Brown, Barry St. John, Liza Strike - background vocals
Jon Lord - synthesizer, piano on "Glad When You're Gone" and "Shanghai'd In Shanghai"

Other credits
Roger Glover - producer
Richard Roy - assistant mastering engineer
Red Steel - revised notes
Louie Austin - engineer
Robert M Corich and Mike Brown - remastering
Mick Carpenter - project coordinator

Charts

Weekly charts

Year-end charts

Certifications

References

External links
Lyrics to songs from Rampant

Nazareth (band) albums
1974 albums
Albums with cover art by Hipgnosis
Albums with cover art by Joe Petagno
Albums produced by Roger Glover
A&M Records albums
Vertigo Records albums